Kody Andrews (born 12 June 2000) is a New Zealand judoka, who won the silver medal in the over-100 kg category representing his country at the 2022 Commonwealth Games.

Biography
Andrews was born on 12 June 2000 in Christchurch, where he is a member of the Premiere Equipe Judo Club. He was runner-up in the under-90 kg class at the 2018 New Zealand national judo championships. The following year, he moved up to the under-100 kg category, and again finished in second place. He first competed overseas at the 2019 Oceania Open under-21 tournament in Perth, Australia, where he won the under-100 kg event.

In 2022, in the lead-up to the Commonwealth Games, Andrews trained and competed overseas. He placed seventh in the over-100 kg class in World Cup events at both the Tunis Open and Algiers Open in March, and was also seventh in the same class at the 2022 Pan American-Oceania Judo Championships in Lima the following month. He then finished in second place in the over-100 kg class at the European Cup event at Winterthur in July, before winning the silver medal in the same division at the 2022 Commonwealth Games.

References

External links
 
 

2000 births
Living people
Sportspeople from Christchurch
New Zealand male judoka
Commonwealth Games silver medallists for New Zealand
Judoka at the 2022 Commonwealth Games
Commonwealth Games medallists in judo
21st-century New Zealand people
Medallists at the 2022 Commonwealth Games